Plateoplia is a genus of moths in the family Geometridae.

Species
Plateoplia acrobelia (Wallengren, 1875)

References

External links
Natural History Museum Lepidoptera genus database

Macariini